Dirang is a village in the Indian state of Arunachal Pradesh. West Kameng is the name of the district that contains village Dirang.

Dirang is one of the 60 constituencies of Legislative Assembly of Arunachal Pradesh. Name of current MLA (August-2019) of this constituency is Phurpa Tsering.

See also
List of constituencies of Arunachal Pradesh Legislative Assembly
Arunachal Pradesh Legislative Assembly

References

Villages in West Kameng district